Saladworks, LLC is a restaurant franchise that serves made-to-order entrée salads, wraps, soups, and sandwiches. Saladworks restaurants are categorized as fast casual, and the company markets its menu as a healthy alternative to other fast food fare. The franchise currently operates 110 restaurant locations in 15 states and is developing locations internationally. It continues to develop exclusively through its Multiple Unit Development approach, focusing on development in metropolitan areas throughout the United States. The restaurant chain also has stores in Canada.

History
Saladworks was founded on October 1, 1986, by John Scardapane, who served as the company's CEO until 2015. The first Saladworks opened in the Cherry Hill Mall, the success of which inspired the opening of 12 additional locations in New Jersey and Pennsylvania.

Saladworks began franchising in 2001, and by 2007 had 88 locations in eight states, including Pennsylvania, New Jersey, Delaware, Maryland, Florida, and Illinois. Today, the franchise operates over 100 restaurant locations in 18 states and has announced plans to expand into new markets in the United States and internationally.

On February 17, 2015, Saladworks filed a Chapter 11 bankruptcy petition and listed Commerce Bank and Metro Bank founder Vernon Hill as a major creditor. The bankruptcy filing said it was looking for an investor.  Saladworks was acquired by Centre Lane Partners in June 2015, and promoted Saladworks president Paul Steck to CEO, replacing founder John Scardapane.

Recent changes

Restaurant redesign
In October 2008, Saladworks began a major branding change, unveiling a new design prototype. Existing restaurants that have adopted the new design, as well as all new Saladworks locations built around the new design, have been dubbed “3G Restaurants” by the company. Changes include refrigerated salad display cases, the omission of menu boards, diffused artificial lighting to emulate daylight entering through skylights, and a higher level of design consistency across all Saladworks locations.

Recent programs

Signature Series
In January 2008, Saladworks launched its Signature Series, which had four celebrity chefs creating a line of seasonal salads

True Nutrition
To increase the nutritional values of its menu and ensure all pre-made signature salads averaged less than 500 calories, Saladworks unveiled True Nutrition in April 2010, a new menu with over 50 salad ingredients such as avocado, edamame, and chick peas.

Industry ranking
In 2012 Entrepreneur Magazine ranked Saladworks #416 of the top 500 franchises in America.  The company was also included as one of "10 Great Franchise Deals" in an article by Daniel P. Smith in QSR Magazine.

References

External links
Official website

Restaurants established in 1986
Restaurant franchises
Restaurant chains in the United States
Restaurants in Pennsylvania
Fast-food chains of the United States
Cuisine of the Mid-Atlantic states
Companies based in Conshohocken, Pennsylvania
Fast casual restaurants
1986 establishments in New Jersey
Companies that filed for Chapter 11 bankruptcy in 2015